Lee You-hyeon (born 8 February 1997) is a South Korean football defender who plays for Gimcheon Sangmu and the South Korea national under-23 football team.

Career statistics

Club

Honours

International
South Korea U23
AFC U-23 Championship: 2020

References

External links 
 

1997 births
Living people
Association football defenders
South Korean footballers
Jeonbuk Hyundai Motors players
Jeonnam Dragons players
K League 1 players
South Korea under-20 international footballers
South Korea under-23 international footballers
Footballers at the 2020 Summer Olympics
Olympic footballers of South Korea